Kaitlyn Watts (born 1 March 2001 in Palmerston North) is a New Zealand professional squash player. As of January 2022, she was ranked number 95 in the world.

References

2001 births
Living people
New Zealand female squash players
21st-century New Zealand women
Sportspeople from Palmerston North
Commonwealth Games competitors for New Zealand
Squash players at the 2022 Commonwealth Games